The Albert and Letha Green House and Barn is a property located in Battle Ground, Washington listed on the National Register of Historic Places.

See also

National Register of Historic Places listings in Clark County, Washington

References

External links 
 Clark County Historic Preservation Program page

Houses in Clark County, Washington
Houses on the National Register of Historic Places in Washington (state)
National Register of Historic Places in Clark County, Washington